Molder or Molders or variation, may refer to:

Generally
 Wood shaper, a tool
 Moldmaker, a job
 A device for or a person who performs molding (process)
 To cover in mold (fungus)

People
 Mölder, an Estonian surname
 Mölders (disambiguation), a German surname
 Bryce Molder (born 1979), U.S. golfer
 Jan de Molder (16th century), Dutch Renaissance woodcarver

Other uses
 , Cold War West German Bundesmarine Lütjens-class guided-missile destroyer
 Jagdgeschwader 51, called “JG 51 Mölders” from 1942 on, was a Luftwaffe fighter wing during World War II
 Jagdgeschwader 74, called “JG 74 Mölders” between 1973 and 2005, is an aviation unit of the German Luftwaffe, based on Neuburg air base in Bavaria

See also

 
 
 
 Carmen Nicole Moelders, U.S. atmospheric scientist
 Muldaur (surname)
 Mulder (surname)
 Moulder (disambiguation)
 Mold (disambiguation)